Nitesh R Pradhan (Nepali: नितेश आर प्रधान, born 11 May 1990 as Nitesh Pradhan) is an Indian journalist based in Sikkim, India. He is the Editor of The Voice of Sikkim online web portal and a correspondent of The Statesman for Sikkim. He is also a singer-lyricist as part of pop duo Anisha & Nitesh.

Early life
He was born into a politically prominent Sikkimese Taksari Newar family to Pradip Pradhan and Renu Chettri in Gangtok. His paternal grandfather is Nahakul Pradhan, a leading figure of the democratic movement who also held cabinet positions in successive governments of the erstwhile Chogyal regime in Sikkim. He is a great-grandnephew of Kashiraj Pradhan, another prominent leader of the democratic movement, also considered as the Father of Sikkimese Journalism. His uncle, Sukumar Pradhan is a two-time former Member of the Sikkim Legislative Assembly. His paternal great-grandmother, Kanti Pradhan was the granddaughter of Taksari Chandrabir Maskey of Pakyong, a Sikkimese feudal lord of many estates in the former Kingdom of Sikkim.

Education
He completed his schooling from Tashi Namgyal Academy, Gangtok. Later, he acquired a bachelor's degree in arts and completed post graduation in mass communication from Sikkim University.

Career
He started singing in the pop duo Anisha & Nitesh since it was formed in 2013 – it was the first pop duo (mixed) act from Sikkim – and has released many Nepali language songs including the chartbuster Maya. His work in media includes print and digital media houses notably  TNT- The Northeast Today, Sikkim Chronicle, Summit Times, Assam Tribune & East Mojo. He reports on a range of such topics as environment, geopolitics, gender, LGBTQ, society and culture of the  Eastern Himalayan region. In 2020, he founded independent online news portal Eastern Himalayan News Service. He has also organised a series of fund raising events for charitable causes in Sikkim and Darjeeling hills. In 2021, he joined as editor in The Voice of Sikkim web portal - the oldest online media in Sikkim.

In 2022, he joined as Line producer for director Onir’s upcoming Hindi language film ‘’Pine Cone’’.

Awards
 2019 - Sikkim Newar Guthi - Sikkim Newar Youth Icon Award
 2021 - Federation of Consumer Association, Sikkim - Concerned Consumer Award

References

External links
; official Twitter account

1990 births
Living people
Indian lyricists
Indian male journalists
21st-century Indian journalists
Newar people
People from Gangtok
Nepali-language singers from India
Journalists from Sikkim
Singers from Sikkim
Indian Gorkhas
Nepali-language writers from India
People from Sikkim